Doryanthes palmeri, also known as the giant spear lily, is one of only two species of plant in the genus Doryanthes and the family Doryanthaceae, both being endemic to eastern Australia. The flowers arise in springtime on a stalk which may reach  in height. A succulent perennial, its leaves are hairless and grow in the shape of a sword. The giant spear lily is listed as Vulnerable under the New South Wales Threatened Species Act (1995).

Doryanthes palmeri is grown as an ornamental plant. It does not tolerate frosts, so in temperate zones it requires protection during the winter months. It requires a sheltered position in full sun.

See also

 List of plants known as lily

References

Doryanthaceae
Flora of New South Wales
Flora of Queensland
Endemic flora of Australia
Garden plants of Australia
Drought-tolerant plants